Maisades (Ancient Greek, "Μαισάδης") was a Thracian of the Odrysian kingdom and perhaps the father of Seuthes II. Xenophon in Anabasis (7.2.32) mentions Maisades as the father of Seuthes.

References

See also 
List of Thracian tribes
Odrysian kingdom

Thracian people
Anabasis (Xenophon)
Odrysian kings